Kozmodemyanovka is a rural locality (a selo) in Shebekinsky District, Belgorod Oblast, Russia. The population was 365 as of 2010. There are 9 streets.

Geography 
Kozmodemyanovka is located 26 km northeast of Shebekino (the district's administrative centre) by road. Starovshchina is the nearest rural locality.

References 

Rural localities in Shebekinsky District